Nigel Carr (born January 22, 1990) is a former American football linebacker. He was a member of the Baltimore Ravens of the National Football League (NFL).

Early years
A native of Jacksonville, Florida, Carr attended First Coast High School. Regarded as a four-star recruit, he was listed as the sixth-ranked inside linebacker prospect in his class.

College career
Carr attended Alabama State, where he transferred from Florida State in 2010. He had been released from his scholarship after a series of felony and misdemeanor charges in August 2010.

Professional career
Carr went undrafted in the 2012 NFL Draft. He was subsequently signed by the Baltimore Ravens. After spending the season without a game appearance, Carr was cut by the Ravens before the 2013 NFL season.

References

External links
Baltimore Ravens bio
Florida State Seminoles bio
Career transactions

1990 births
Living people
First Coast High School alumni
American football linebackers
Alabama State Hornets football players
Baltimore Ravens players
Players of American football from Jacksonville, Florida
Florida State Seminoles football players